Frederikshavn municipality is the northernmost Danish municipality, located in Region Nordjylland.

As a result of Kommunalreformen ("The Municipal Reform" of 2007), it is a merger between the previous municipalities of Frederikshavn, Skagen and Sæby. The new municipality has an area of 642 km² and a total population of 58,878 (2022).

The first mayor of the new municipality was Erik Sørensen (Social Democrats). Since 2014 it has been Birgit Hansen which governs by a broad coalition with the rest of all the parties.

Towns
The following is a list of settlements within the municipality by population.

Mayor
For a list of mayors in Skagen and Sæby before the 2007 merger, see below.

Frederikshavn

Former Skagen municipality

Former Sæby municipality

Politics

Municipal council
Frederikshavn's municipal council consists of 29 members, elected every four years.

Below are the municipal councils elected since the Municipal Reform of 2007.

Twin towns – sister cities

Frederikshavn is twinned with:
 Borlänge, Sweden
 Bremerhaven, Germany
 Larvik, Norway
 Qeqqata, Greenland
 Qingdao, China
 Tranås, Sweden

See also
Grenen
North Jutlandic Island

References

External links

  
Region Nordjylland site

 
Municipalities of the North Jutland Region
Municipalities of Denmark
Populated places established in 2007